Massacre Peak, a summit at an elevation of  in the Cookes Range in Luna County, New Mexico.

History
The route of the Southern Emigrant Trail passed just north of this peak as did the San Antonio-San Diego Mail Line, Butterfield Overland Mail, and other stagecoach lines. 

The peaks name refers to the time of the Apache Wars following the Bascom Affair when the Apache destroyed most of the stations and many coaches and killed many of the station staff, drivers and passengers. Many violent incidents followed such as the Battle of Cookes Canyon.

Near the end of the American Civil War, Fort Cummings was established two miles (3.2 km) northeast of the peak, near Cooke's Spring and stage station.

References 

Landforms of Luna County, New Mexico
Mountains of New Mexico
Mountains of Luna County, New Mexico